Matrix code may refer to:
Matrix barcode, two-dimensional barcode, as opposed to linear and stacked symbologies
Matrix digital rain, or matrix code, the logo of The Matrix franchise
 Matrix (record production), or master, a disc used in the production of phonograph records
 Matrix number, of a gramophone record